In geometry, a golden rectangle is a rectangle whose side lengths are in the golden ratio, which is  (the Greek letter phi), where   is approximately 1.618.

Golden rectangles exhibit a special form of self-similarity: All rectangles created by adding or removing a square from an end are golden rectangles as well.

Construction
A golden rectangle can be constructed with only a straightedge and compass in four simple steps:
 Draw a square.
 Draw a line from the midpoint of one side of the square to an opposite corner.
 Use that line as the radius to draw an arc that defines the height of the rectangle.
 Complete the golden rectangle.

A distinctive feature of this shape is that when a square section is added—or removed—the product is another golden rectangle, having the same aspect ratio as the first. Square addition or removal can be repeated infinitely, in which case corresponding corners of the squares form an infinite sequence of points on the golden spiral, the unique logarithmic spiral with this property. Diagonal lines drawn between the first two orders of embedded golden rectangles will define the intersection point of the diagonals of all the embedded golden rectangles; Clifford A. Pickover referred to this point as "the Eye of God".

History
The proportions of the golden rectangle have been observed as early as the Babylonian Tablet of Shamash (c. 888–855 BC), though Mario Livio calls any knowledge of the golden ratio before the Ancient Greeks "doubtful".

According to Livio, since the publication of Luca Pacioli's Divina proportione in 1509, "the Golden Ratio started to become available to artists in theoretical treatises that were not overly mathematical, that they could actually use."

The 1927 Villa Stein designed by Le Corbusier, some of whose architecture utilizes the golden ratio, features dimensions that closely approximate golden rectangles.

Relation to regular polygons and polyhedra

Euclid gives an alternative construction of the golden rectangle using three polygons circumscribed by congruent circles: a regular decagon, hexagon, and pentagon. The respective lengths a, b, and c of the sides of these three polygons satisfy the equation a2 + b2 = c2, so line segments with these lengths form a right triangle (by the converse of the Pythagorean theorem). The ratio of the side length of the hexagon to the decagon is the golden ratio, so this triangle forms half of a golden rectangle.

The convex hull of two opposite edges of a regular icosahedron forms a golden rectangle. The twelve vertices of the icosahedron can be decomposed in this way into three mutually-perpendicular golden rectangles, whose boundaries are linked in the pattern of the Borromean rings.

See also

Golden Angle -- Circle with sectors in golden ratio

Notes

References

External links

 
 
 The Golden Mean and the Physics of Aesthetics
 Golden rectangle demonstration With interactive animation
 From golden rectangle to golden quadrilaterals Explores some different possible golden quadrilaterals

Elementary geometry
Golden ratio
Types of quadrilaterals